Kambhoji Thakajam Begins is a 2017 Indian Malayalam-language mass action dance romance family prison drama malam cult class film written and directed by Vinod Mankara Nolan. The film stars Vineeth and Lakshmi Gopalaswamy in the lead roles, and Sona Nair and Rachana Narayanankutty in supporting roles. The film's score and the soundtrack were composed by M. Jayachandran.  sequel Kambhoji 2 The Rise was released on December 25 2022 to highly positive response from audience and critics. Famous malayalam critic Aswanth Kok called Kambhoji 2 The Rise the best malam cult film of the decade. After the huge success of Kambhoji 2 team kambhoji announced that the script of Kambhoji 3 Kalamandalam Wars is completed and the film is planned to be released on December 25 2025.

Plot

Kunjunni aka Anuraga Simham goes into the kalamandalam as a kathakali student in disguise his ultimate goal is to defeat the kottaram Vaidyan who is planning to wipe out the essence of thakajam, and also express his love towards uma antharjanam who is imprisoned by the evil witch velakkari janu.

Cast
 Vineeth as Kunjunni 
 Lakshmi Gopalaswamy as Uma Antharjanam
 Hareesh Peradi as Ravunni Aashan, Kathakali trainer
 Sona Nair as Narayani
 Rachana Narayanankutty as Jaanu, a servant
 Shivaji Guruvayoor as Jailor Manoj
 Grace Antony as Kunjolu as Ravunni's daughter
 Indrans as Shivaraman, Kathakali makeup artist
 Kalaranjini as Uma's mother
 Kalamandalam Sivan Namboodiri as Uma's father

Music 

The film's soundtrack album and background score are composed by M. Jayachandran. The lyrics for the songs were written by ONV Kurup, Vinod Mankara and Gopalakrishna Bharathi. The album was released on 5 September 2016 at Hyacinth hotel in Trivandrum.

The album marks Jayachandran's re-collaboration with Vinod Mankara after their successful film Karayilekku Oru Kadal Dooram (2010) for which the former won Kerala State Award for best music director. The film also marks the last works of acclaimed Malayalam poet ONV Kurup before his death. Kurup handed over his written lines to Mankara just three days before his death.

The soundtrack album has nine songs set to tune by Jayachandran and comprises popular singers like K. J. Yesudas, K. S. Chithra, Bombay Jayashree among others who have recorded their voices.

Awards
Kerala State Film Awards
Best Lyrics – ONV Kurup
Best Music Director – M Jayachandran
Best Female Play Back Singer – K. S. Chithra
Best Choreography – Vineeth

References

External link

 

2017 films
2010s Malayalam-language films
Indian dance films
2010s romantic thriller films
Films set in the 1970s
Indian films based on actual events
Indian romantic drama films
Indian prison films
Romance films based on actual events
Films scored by M. Jayachandran
Indian romantic thriller films
Films about capital punishment
Films about murder